The Marquart-Mercer Farm in Clark County, Ohio, southwest of Springfield, Ohio, is listed on the U.S. National Register of Historic Places.

The listing includes a three contributing buildings which include a two-story brick Federal-style house and a log-and-brace-beam barn.  Philip Marquart moved here from Amity Township, Pennsylvania, in the early 1800s and built a log cabin, then later the brick farmhouse.

The property was farmed by Marquart and Mercer families.

References

National Register of Historic Places in Clark County, Ohio
Federal architecture in Ohio
Buildings and structures completed in 1827
1827 establishments in Ohio